Titu is a town in Romania. Titu may also refer to:

Titu (name)
Titu, Iran (disambiguation)
Titu Maiorescu University in Bucharest, Romania

See also
Titus (disambiguation)